This is a partial list of women's association football club teams from all over the world sorted by the confederation they reside in. Only teams playing at the highest level in each country are shown; for clubs playing at lower divisions, see the separate articles.

Some clubs do not play in the league of the country in which they are located, but in a neighboring country's league. Where this is the case the club is noted as such.

AFC (Asia)

Australia
Main League: A-League Women
Adelaide United
Brisbane Roar (2)
Canberra United (2)
Melbourne City  (4)   
Melbourne Victory (3)  DC
Newcastle Jets 
Perth Glory
Sydney FC   (3)
Wellington Phoenix
Western Sydney Wanderers
Western United

Bangladesh
Main League: Bangladesh Women's Football League

Bashundhara Kings
Begum Anowara Sporting Club
Cumilla United
FC Uttar Bongo
Kacharipara Eleven
Nasrin Sporting Club
Swapnochura & Akkelpur Football Academy
Spartan MK Gallatico Sylhet FC

China
Main League: Chinese Women's Super League
Beijing   (2)
Changchun Jiuyin
Henan Jianye
Jiangsu   (2)
Meizhou Hakka
Shaanxi Chang'an Athletic
Shandong Sports Lottery
Shanghai Shengli
Sichuan
Wuhan Jianghan University   (2)   DC

India
Main League: Indian Women's League
Group A
BBK Dav FC
FC Kolhapur City
Kickstart FC
KRYPHSA FC
Sethu FC

Group B
Bangalore United FC
Bidesh XI FC
Gokulam Kerala
Kenkre
Odisha Police FC
Sreebhumi FC

Indonesia
Main League: Liga 1 Putri
 Arema Putri
 Bali United Women
 Galanita Persipura
 Persebaya Putri
 Persib Putri   (1)   DC
 Persija Putri
 PSIS Putri
 PSM Putri
 PSS Putri
 TIRA-Persikabo Kartini

Iran

Main League: Kowsar Women Football League

Bam Khatoon

Iraq
Main League: Iraqi Women's Football League

Hong Kong

Japan

Main League: WE League

Albirex Niigata
Chifure AS Elfen Saitama
INAC Kobe Leonessa (1)     DC
JEF United Chiba
MyNavi Sendai
Nojima Stella Kanagawa Sagamihara
Omiya Ardija Ventus
AC Nagano Parceiro
Sanfrecce Hiroshima Regina
Tokyo Verdy Beleza 
Urawa Red Diamonds

Korea Republic

Main League: WK League
Boeun Sangmu
Changnyeong
Gyeongju
Hwacheon KSPO
Hyundai Steel Red Angels   (9)  (DC)
Sejong Sportstoto
Seoul
Suwon  (1)

Lebanon 

Main League: Lebanese Women's Football League

 BFA
 EFP
 ÓBerytus
 Safa
 SAS
 Super Girls
 Taadod Mazraat Chouf
 United Tripoli

Pakistan 

 Balochistan United W.F.C.
 Diya W.F.C.
 Gilgit-Baltistan FA
 Islamabad Football Association
 Jafa W.F.C.
 Karachi Kichers W.F.C.
 Karachi United
 Pakistan Army W.F.C.
 Punjab W.F.C.
 Sports Science W.F.C.
 WAPDA W.F.C.
 Young Rising Stars F.F.C.

Philippines 

Hiraya F.C.
Kaya F.C.–Iloilo
Stallion Laguna
Tuloy F.C.

Thailand
Main League: Thai Women's League
Bangkok
BGC Asian Scholars
Burirat Academy
Chonburi FA
Chonburi Sports School
Kasem Bundit Uni
Khon Kaen
Lampang Sports School 
MH Nakhonsi

Taiwan
Main League: Taiwan Mulan Football League
Hualien    (3)
Kaohsiung Sunny Bank
New Taipei Hang Yuen
Taichung     (3)   (DC)
Taipei
Taoyuan Mars

Vietnam
Main League: Vietnamese Women's Football Championship
Hô Chi Minh City    (10)   DC
Hà Nội I   (10) 
Phong Phú Hà Nam   (1)
Thái Nguyen T&T
Than Khoáng Sản Việt Nam     (2)

CAF (Africa)

Algeria
Main League: Algerian Championship
Affak Relizane
ASE Alger-Centre
AS Oran-Centre
CLT Belouizdad
COS Tiaret
FC Béjaïa
FC Constantine

Egypt
Main League: Egyptian Women's Premier League
Wadi Degla    (13)    DC

Ethiopia

 Tiret Female Football Club
 Addis Ababa Female Football Club

Ghana 
Main League: Ghana Women's Premier League

 Ampem Darkoa Ladies
 Ashtown Ladies
 Berry Ladies
 Fabulous Ladies
 Hasaacas Ladies
 Kumasi Sports Academy Ladies
 Lady Strikers
 Northern Ladies
 Police Ladies

 Soccer Intellectuals Ladies
 Supreme Ladies

 Thunder Queens

Kenya
Main League: Kenyan Premier League
Mathare United FC

Morocco
Main League: Moroccan Women's Championship Division One
Ain Atiq
Amjad Taroudant
Assa Zag
Chabab Mohammédia
AS FAR   (9)   DC
FUS
Ittihad Tanger
Jawharat Najm Larache
Municipal Laâyoune
Raja Aïn Harrouda
Raja Aït Iaaza
Raja CA
Sporting Casablanca
Wydad AC

Nigeria
Main League: Nigerian Championship
Abia Angels
Bayelsa Queens    (4)
Confluence Queens
Delta Queens   (5)
Dream Stars
Edo Queens
Ibom Angels
Nasarawa Amazons    (2)
Osun Babes
Pelican Stars     (7)
Rivers Angels   (5)   (DC)
FC Robo
Royal Queens
Sunshine Queens

Tunisia
Main League: Tunisian Ligue
ASF Sahel
ISSEP Kef

CONCACAF (North and Central America)

Costa Rica 
Main League: Primera División Femenina de Costa Rica

Current teams
Alajuelense
Coronado
Dimas Escazú
Herediano
AD Pococí
Saprissa
Sporting
Suva Sports

El Salvador 
Main League: Primera División Femenina de El Salvador

Current teams
Alianza
Águila
Santa Tecla
Once Deportivo
Limeno
Jocoro
Firpo
Isidro Metapan
Chalatenango
Atlético Marte
Sonsonate
FAS

Guatemala 
Main League: National Women's Football League of Guatemala

Mexico 
Main League: Liga MX Femenil

Current teams
América     (1) 
Atlas
Atlético San Luis
Cruz Azul
Guadalajara    (2) DC
Juárez
León
Mazatlán
Monterrey    (2)
Necaxa
Pachuca
Puebla
Querétaro
Santos
Tijuana
Toluca
UANL           (4) 
UNAM

Panama 
Main League: Primera División Femenina de Panamá

Current teams
Colón C-3 FC
Tauro FC
CD Universitario
San Francisco FC
CAI La Chorrera
CD Plaza Amador
Azuero FC
SD Panamá Oeste
SD Atlético Nacional
Veraguas FC
Costa del Este FC
Deportivo Árabe Unido
San Martín FC
Sporting SM
CD Centenario
Alianza FC

Trinidad & Tobago

Current teams
Sando
St. Augustine
Trincity Nationals
QPCC
Defence Force
Police
UTT
Jewels
Tobago Chicas
St. Augustine Juniors

United States

Main League: National Women's Soccer League

Current teams
 Angel City
 Chicago Red Stars 
 Gotham FC
 Houston Dash
 Kansas City Current
 North Carolina Courage  (2)
 OL Reign
 Orlando Pride
 Portland Thorns (3)  DC
 Racing Louisville
 San Diego Wave
 Washington Spirit   (1)

CONMEBOL (South America)

Argentina

Main League: Campeonato de Futbol Femenino

Boca Juniors   (24)   DC
Defensores de Belgrano
El Porvenir
Estudiantes (LP)
Excursionistas
Gimnasia La Plata
Huracán
Independiente
Lanús
Platense
Racing Club
River Plate    (11)
Rosario Central
SAT
UAI Urquiza   (5)
Villa San Carlos

Bolivia
 Main League: Bolivian women's football championship

Brazil

 Main League: Campeonato Brasileiro de Futebol Feminino Série A1

 Bahia
 Botafogo 
 Corinthians   (4)   DC
 Cruzeiro
 Flamengo       (1)
 Associação Ferroviária   (2)
 Grêmio
 Internacional
 Kindermann
 Minas ICESP
 Napoli
 Palmeiras
 Real Brasília
 São Paulo    (1)
 Santos                    (1)
 São José EC

Chile
 Main League: Chilean women's football championship

Palestino
Santiago Morning
U. de Chile
Santiago Wanderers
Audax Italiano
Union Espanola
La Serena
U. Catolica
boston College
Everton

Colombia

 Main League: Liga Aguila Femenina
Group A
 Atlético Nacional
 Deportivo Pereira
 Independiente Medellin
 Once Caldas

Group B
 Fortaleza
 Independiente Santa Fe
 Millionarios
 La Equidad

Group C
 Atlético Bucaramanga
 Cúcuta Deportivo
 Atlético Junior
 Real San Andrés

Group D
 América de Cali
 Atlético Cali
 Cortuluá
 Deportivo Cali

Group E
 Atlético Huila
 Deportes Tolima
 Deportivo Pasto
 Orsomarso

Ecuador
 Main League: Ecuadorian women's football championship 

Cruz del Sur - Tena
Cumandá - Puyo
Espuce - Quito
Grupo Siete - Montecristi
Las Palmas - Santo Domingo
LDU Amateur - Quito
Quito FC - Quito
Rocafuerte - Guayaquil
Siete de febrero - Babahoyo
Unión - Babahoyo
Unión Española - Guayaquil
U. San Francisco - Quito

Paraguay
 Main League: Paraguayan women's football championship

Peru
 Main League: Peruvian women's football championship

Uruguay
 Main League: Campeonato Uruguayo Femenino 
Atenas
Defensor Sporting
Fénix
Liverpool
Nacional
Náutico
Peñarol
River Plate
Wanderers

Venezuela
Main League: Venezuelan women's football championship
Grupo Centro Oriental
Dvo La Guaira
Caracas F.C.
Atl. Vzla
Lala FC
Estudiantes de Guárico
Estudiantes de Caracas
Dvo Anzoátegui
Grupo Occidental
Dvo Táchira
Zamora FC
Flor de Patria
Secasports
Carabobo FC
Caucheros FC
Zulia FC

UEFA (Europe)

Austria
Main League: ÖFB-Frauenliga
SPG SCR Altach/FFC Vorderland
SKV Altenmarkt
Austria Wien
FC Bergheim
First Vienna
Kleinmünchen/BW Linz
SV Neulengbach  (12)
SKN St. Pölten       (7)   (DC)
Sturm Graz
Wacker Innsbruck

Albania
Main League: Albanian Women's National Championship
Apolonia      (4)
KF Tirana
FC Kinostudio
Kukësi
Laçi
Lushnja
Partizani Tirana
Skënderbeu
Teuta
Vllaznia   (8) DC

Belarus
Main League: Premier League
ABFF U19
Bobruichanka      (11) 
Dynamo Brest
Dinamo Minsk  (3) DC
Dnepr Mogilev
Gomel
FC Minsk    (7)
Smorgon
Vitebsk
Zorka-BDU     (1)

Belgium
Main League: Super League
Anderlecht  (5)    DC
Sporting Charleroi
Club YLA
Eendracht Aalst
Genk
Gent
OH Leuven 
Standard Liège    (2)
White Star Woluwé
Zulte Waregem

Bosnia and Herzegovina
Main League: Bosnia and Herzegovina Women's Premier League
Borac Banja Luka
Igman Konjic
Leotar
HŠK Posušje
SFK 2000   (20)     (DC)
Široki Brijeg
Sloboda Tuzla
Sloga Doboj
Tuzla City
Velež Mostar
Zrinjski Mostar
Željezničar

Bulgaria
Main League: Bulgarian women's football championship
Chardafon 1919
Enko Plovdiv
Etar VT
Lokomotiv Stara Zagora   (1)     DC
NSA Sofia   (15)  
Paldin
Pirin
Rial Kovachevtsi
Sevlievo Ladies
Sofia
Sportika
Super Sport
Svetkavitsa Gradezhnitsa
Varna

Czech Republic
Main League: Czech First Division (Women)
Ostrava
Dukla Praha
Horní Heršpice
Slavia Praha   (8)    DC
Slovan Liberec
Slovacko
Sparta Praha             (21)   
Viktoria Plzeň

Croatia
Main League: Croatian Women's First Football League
Agram
Dinamo Zagreb 
Donat
Hajduk
Osijek    (23)   
Rijeka 
Split     (3)    DC
Viktorija

Cyprus
Main League: Cypriot First Division
Apollon      (10)   DC 
Aris Limassol
Geroskipou
Karmiótissa Chrysomiliá
Lakatamia
Lefkothea Nicosia
AC Omonia

Denmark
Main League: Danish Women's League

AGF
Brøndby    (12)  
Fortuna Hjorring   (9)
KoldingQ
HB Køge      (2)   DC
FC Nordsjælland
Sundby BK 
FC Thy-Thisted Q

England

Main League: FA Women's Super League
Arsenal    
Aston Villa
Brighton & Hove Albion
Chelsea     (5)    DC
Everton
Leicester City
Liverpool
Manchester City    (1)
Manchester United
Tottenham Hotspur
West Ham United

Second Division : FA Women's Championship
Blackburn Rovers
Bristol City
Birmingham City
Charlton Athletic
Coventry United
Crystal Palace
Durham
Lewes
London City Lionesses
Sheffield United
Sunderland
Southampton

Estonia
Main League: Naiste Meistriliiga
FC Flora  (5)     DC
Lootos
Saku Sporting
Tabasalu
Tallinna Kalev
Tammeka
Tulevik ja Suure-Jaani
Vaprus

Faroe Islands
Main League: 1. deild kvinnur
07 Vestur
B36 Tórshavn         (4)
EB Streymur / Skála            (2)
HB           (7)
KI           (19)  DC
NSÍ
Vikingur

France
Main League: Division 1 Féminine
 FC Girondins de Bordeaux 
 Dijon
 Fleury 91
 EA Guingamp  (1)
 Le Havre
 Montpellier HSC     (2)
 Olympique Lyonnais (15)   DC
 Paris Saint-Germain     (1)   
 Paris FC   (6)
 Rodez
 ASJ Soyaux-Charente  (1)
 Stade de Reims   (5)

Finland
Main League: Kansallainen Liiga
Honka   (4)
HJK  (23)         DC
HPS
FC Ilves
KuPS
NJS
ONS
PK-35
PK-35 Vantaa   (6)
Åland United   (2)

Germany
Main League: Frauen-Bundesliga
 Bayer Leverkusen
 Bayern Munich          (4)  
 Eintracht Frankfurt           (7)
 Freiburg
 Hoffenheim
 1. FC Köln
 Meppen
 MSV Duisburg
 SGS Essen
 Turbine Potsdam        (6)
 Wolfsburg           (7)     DC
 Werder Bremen

Greece
Main League: Greek A Division
Aris
Avantes Chalkida
Doxa Pigadakia
Elpides Karditsas
Kastoria
AEL
Leontikos
Odysseas Moschato
OFI Crete
Olimpiada Imittou
PAOK  (17)   DC
Rethymniakis Enosis
Trikala 2011
Trianton Ialysos
Volos 2004

Hungary
Main League: First Division
Astra Hungary
Diósgyőri VTK
Fehérvár
Ferencvárosi TC        (5)         (DC)
Győri ETO
Kelen
MTK        (7)
Puskás Akadémia
Szekszárdi
Szent Mihaly
Viktória FC         (2)
Újpest

Iceland
Main League: Úrvalsdeild kvenna
Afturelding
Breiðablik (18)  
Keflavìk
KR
Selfoss
Stjarnan (4)
Þróttur Reykjavik
Þór/KA  (2)
Valur   (12)     (DC)
ÍBV

Israel
Main League: Ligat Nashim
ASA Tel Aviv    (8)
Hapoel Be'er Sheva
Hapoel Jerusalem
Hapoel Petah Tikva
Ramat HaSharon   (2)    
Kiryat Gat   (4)    DC
Maccabi Emek Hefer  
Maccabi Kishronot Hadera

Italy
Main League: Serie A
Como
[Ferineze Women's F.C.|Fiorentina]]  (1)
Inter Milan
Juventus    (5)     DC
A.C. Milan
Parma
Pomigliano
A.S. Roma
Sampdoria
Sassuolo

Second Division: Serie B
Apulia Trani
Arezzo
Brescia
Cesena
Chievo Verona
Cittadella
Genoa
Hellas Verona
Lazio
Napoli
Ravenna
San Marino
Torres
Tavagnacco
Ternana
Trento

Kosovo
Main League: Women's Football Superleague of Kosovo
Bazeli
Dukagjini
Hajvalia   (2)  DC
Heroinat
Intelektualet
Jakova
Kosova   (2)
Liria
Llapi
Malisheva
Mitrovica     (4)    DC
KFF Presingu
Vizioni

Kazakhstan
Main League: Kazakhstani women's football championship
BIIK Kazygurt   (14)    DC
Kaiser
Kyzylzhar
Okzhetpes
SDYuSShOR 8
Turan

Latvia
Main League: Latvian Women's League
Auda
Iecava
Metta
Olaine
Rigas FS     (8)    DC
SFK Rīga
SK Super Nova

Lithuania
Main League: A Lyga
Banga
Vilnius
FC Gintra     (20) DC
Hegelmann
MFA Žalgiris
Saned

Luxembourg
Main League: Dames Ligue 1
SC Bettembourg    (2)
FC Blo-Wäiss Izeg
Ell    (1)
Entente Differdingen-Luna
Jeunesse Junglinster    (6)
Mamer 32
Progrès Niederkorn
Racing    (2)   DC
Rosport-Berd-Christnach
Wincrange
Wormeldange-Munsbach-CSG
Young Boys

Malta
Main League: Maltese First Division (women)
Birkirkara (10)   DC
Gudja United
Hibernians (12)
Mġarr United
Mtarfa
Raiders Lija
San Ġwann
Swieqi United

Moldova
Main League: Moldovan women's football championship
Anenii Noi   (3)  (DC)
Belceanca
Nistru
Noroc Nimoreni   (3)
Rainier
ȘS No.11 Real Success
FC ŞS-4-PGU-Legia

Montenegro
Main League: Montenegrin Women's League
ŽFK Breznica    (5) DC
Budućnost Podgorica    (2)
Cvetex
ŽFK Ekonomist     (4)
Mladost 2015
Zora

Netherlands
Main League: Eredivisie (women)
ADO Den Haag     (1)
Ajax   (2)
Alkmaar
Excelsior
Feyenoord
Fortuna Sittard
Heerenveen
PEC Zwolle  
PSV
Telstar
Twente      (8) DC

Norway

Main League: Toppserien
 Avaldsnes IL 
 Arna-Bjornar
 Brann     
 Kolbotn            (3)
 LSK Kvinner     (7)
 Lyn
 Rosenborg
 Røa IL   (5)
 Stabæk   (2) 
 Vålerenga     (1)

North Macedonia
Main League: Macedonian women's football championship
Atletiko
Borec
Dragon 2014  (4)
Istatov    (1) 
Junajted
Kamenica Sasa    (1)   DC
Kočani   (1)
Ljuboten
Plačkovica
Prilep
Rečica
Shkupi 2019
Shkëndija 
Tiverija
Top Gol

Northern Ireland
Main League: Women's Premiership
Cliftonville
Crusaders Strikers        (6)
Derry City
Glentoran          (9)   DC
Linfield               (4)
Lisburn
Mid-Ulster
Sion Swifts

Portugal
Main League: Campeonato Nacional de Futebol Feminino
Clube de Albergaria
Amora
Damaiense
Famalicāo
Marítimo
Atlético Ouriense  (2)
Benfica   (2) DC
Braga    (1)    
Sporting CP     (2)
Torreense
Valadares Gaia
Vilaverdense

Poland
Main League: Ekstraliga Kobiet
AP Orlen Gdańsk
Bydgoszcz
Czarni Sosnowiec    (13)
Górnik Łęczna    (3)   
GKS Katowice
Medyk Konin   (4)
Pogón Szczecin
Pogoń Tczew
Sportowa Czwórka Radom
UJ Krakow
UKS Łódź     (1)   DC
Śląsk Wrocław

Romania
Main League: Liga I
 Arad
 Banat Girls
 Carmen Bucureşti
 Csíkszereda Miercurea Ciuc
 CSM Alexandria
 Fair Play București
 Fotbol Feminin Baia Mare
 Târgu Mureș
 Olimpia Cluj   (9)    (DC)
 Politehnica Timişoara
 Universitatea Galați
 Vasas

Russia
Main League: Russian Championship
 CSKA Moscow    (2) 
 Chertanovo Moscow
 Krasnodar
 Lokomotiv Moscow    (1) DC
 Rostov
 Rubin Kazan
 Ryazan VDV    (4) 
 Yenisey Krasnoyarsk
 Zvezda 2005 Perm    (6)
 Zenit Saint Petersburg

Republic of Ireland

 Athlone Town
 Bohemian
 Cork City
 DLR Waves
 Galway
 Peamount United
 Shelbourne
 Sligo Rovers
 Treaty United
 Wexford Youths

Scotland

Main League: SWPL 1
 Aberdeen
 Celtic
 Glasgow City    (14) 
 Hamilton Academical
 Hearts 
 Hibernian   (3)
 Motherwell 
 Partick Thistle
 Rangers   (1) DC
 Spartans 

Second Division : SWPL 2
 Boroughmuir Thistle
 Dundee United
 Glasgow
 Kilmarnock
 Queens Park
 St Johnstone
 Stirling University

Serbia
Main League: Serbian Super Liga
Crvena Zvezda
Kanjiža
Kolubara
Mašinac Niš   (3)
Požarevac
Radnički 1923
Sloga Zemun
Spartak Subotica      (10) (DC)
Vojvodina
FC Zemun

Slovakia
Main League: Slovak Women's First League
Dukla Banská Bystrica
Nitra
NMŠK 1922 Bratislava
Parizán Bardejov    (1) 
Poprad
Slovan Bratislava    (14) (DC)
Spartak Myjava
Spartak Trnava
Trenčin
ŠKF Žilina

Slovenia
Main League: Slovenian Women's League
Ajdovščina
Cerklje
Krim
Ljubljana
MSM Ptuj
Olimpija Ljubljana
Pomurje
Radomlje

Spain

Main League: Liga F
 Alhama CF
 Athletic Bilbao             (5)
 Atlético Madrid         (3)   
 Barcelona        (7)      (DC)
 Deportivo Alavés Gloriosas
 Granadilla Tenerife
 Levante       (4)
 Levante Las Planas 
 Madrid
 Real Madrid
 Real Betis
 Real Sociedad
 Sevilla
 Sporting de Huelva 
 Valencia CF
 Villarreal

Sweden

Main League: Damallsvenskan
 AIK 
 Brommapojkarna 
 Djurgårdens   (2)
 Eskilstuna United
 Hammarby   (1)
 BK Häcken   (1)
 IFK Kalmar
 KIF Orebro
 Kristianstads
 Linkopings             (3)
 Piteå     (1)
 FC Rosengård            (13)   DC
 Umeå IK   (7)
 Vittsjö

Switzerland
Main League: Nationalliga A
Aarau
Basel
Grasshopper                    (1)
Luzern                      (5)
Rapperswil-Jona
Servette Chênois  (1)   
St. Gallen
Young Boys                 (11)
Yverdon
Zurich          (10)    DC

Turkey
Main League: Turkish Women's Football Super League
 Group A

 ALG Spor  (1)  DC
 Altay
 Beşiktaş    (2) 
 Dudullu Spor
 Fatih Karagümrük
 Fatih Vatan Spor
 Hakkarigücü Spor
 Hatayspor
 Kdz. Ereğli Belediye Spor

 Group B

 1207 Antalya Spor
 Adana Demirspor
 Amed
 Ataşehir Belediyespor
 Fenerbahçe
 Fomget Gençlik ve Spor
 Galatasaray
 Kireçburnu
 Konak Belediyespor   (5)
 Trabzonspor     (1)

Ukraine
Main League: Ukrainian Women's League
Ateks Kyiv
Dnipro-1
Dynamo Kyiv    (1)
EMC Podolie
Kolos Kovalivka
Kryvbas
Ladomyr
Mariupol
Pantery Uman
Shakhtar Donetsk
Veres Rivne   
Vorskla Poltava    (3)   DC

Wales
Main League: Adran Premier
Abergavenny Town
Aberystwyth Town
Barry Town United
Cardiff City           (1)
Cardiff Met.      (6)
Pontypridd Town
Swansea City            (5)  DC
Wem Town

OFC (Oceania)

Fiji
Main League: Fiji Women's Super League
Labasa
Ba
Suva
Rewa
Nadroga
Tailevu Naitasiri

New Zealand
Main League: National Women's League
Auckland Football
Canterbury United
Capital Football
Central Football
Northern Lights
Southern United
WaiBop United

References

 
List
Womens